Pro Rally 2002, or simply Pro Rally on the GameCube, is a video game of the racing genre released in 2002 by Ubi Soft. The game contains 20 licensed cars including Toyota Corolla WRC, Audi Quattro and 48 courses.  The game is a sequel to the 2000 game Pro Rally 2001.

Reception

The GameCube version was met with mixed reception, as GameRankings gave it a score of 60%, while Metacritic gave it 64 out of 100.

References

External links

2002 video games
PlayStation 2 games
GameCube games
Rally racing video games
Ubisoft games
Video game sequels
Video games developed in Spain